Pony is an unincorporated community and census-designated place in northeastern Madison County, Montana, United States on the eastern edge of the Tobacco Root Mountains. It includes the  Pony Historic District, a historic district with 95 contributing buildings listed on the National Register of Historic Places.

The town gained its name from the nickname of one of its early miners, Tecumseth Smith, a small man nicknamed "Pony" because of his diminutive size.

Settled in the 1860s, in the late nineteenth century, Pony was a prosperous gold-mining community with at least 5,000 residents.  Mining operations declined in the early 20th century and all were closed by 1922.

A number of historic buildings from Pony's boom era remain in the old town today. Major buildings are managed, voluntarily, by The Pony Homecoming Club, a non-profit organization that maintains the town's public spaces.

Montana Highway 283 passes through town. It is about 6 miles from Harrison.

Former Montana Lieutenant Gov. Karl Ohs owned a ranch in Pony.

Demographics

Notes

Unincorporated communities in Madison County, Montana
Ghost towns in Montana
Historic districts on the National Register of Historic Places in Montana
Queen Anne architecture in Montana
National Register of Historic Places in Madison County, Montana
Populated places on the National Register of Historic Places in Montana